Xtra-Acme USA is the US follow up to the album Acme by the group Jon Spencer Blues Explosion.  It is a collection of B-sides and remixes of songs originally appearing on the main album.  This release differs slightly from the UK version, called Acme Plus. Two tracks from Xtra-Acme USA are not included in Acme Plus ("Lovin' Machine (Automator)" and "Calvin (Zebra Ranch)"); however, the same is true for the Acme Plus album.  Two of the tracks contained on it ("Right Place, Wrong Time" and "I Wanna Make it All Right (Zebra Ranch)") are not on Xtra-Acme USA.

Artwork
The album cover features actress Winona Ryder, who starred in the music video for "Talk About The Blues", which appeared in the band's sixth studio album, Acme.

Track listings

Xtra-Acme USA

"Wait a Minute" - 3:48
"Get Down Lover" - 3:47
"Confused" - 3:04
"Magical Colors (31 Flavors)" - 4:09
"Not Yet" - 4:08
"Get Old" - 1:46
"Bacon" - 3:32
"Blue Green Olga [Remix]" - 4:30
"Heavy [Remix]" - 3:13
"Lap Dance" - 3:26
"Leave Me Alone So I Can Rock Again" - 5:06
"Soul Trance" - 4:28
"Electricity" - 2:30
"New Year" - 2:58
"Lovin' Machine (Automator)" - 3:39
"Chowder" - 3:16
"T.A.T.B. [For the Saints and the Sinners Remix]" - 7:29
"Hell" - 3:25
"Calvin (Zebra Ranch)" - 4:08
[Unlisted Track/Radio Advert for Acme] - 1:36

Acme Plus

"Wait a Minute" - 3:48
"Get Down Lover" - 3:47
"Confused" - 3:04
"Magical Colors (31 Flavors)" - 4:09
"Not Yet" - 4:08
"Get Old" - 1:46
"Bacon" - 3:32
"Blue Green Olga [Remix]" - 4:30
"Heavy [Remix]" - 3:13
"Lap Dance" - 3:26
"Right Place, Wrong Time" - 3:41
"Leave Me Alone So I Can Rock Again" - 5:06
"Soul Trance" - 4:28
"Electricity" - 2:30
"New Year" - 2:58
"Chowder" - 3:16
"T.A.T.B. [For the Saints and the Sinners Remix]" - 7:29
"Hell" - 3:25
"I Wanna Make it All Right (Zebra Ranch)" - 3:50
[Unlisted Track/Radio Advert for Acme] - 1:36

References

1998 albums
Jon Spencer Blues Explosion albums
Mute Records albums